José Arturo Rubio (born 1926) was a Spanish boxer. He competed in the men's heavyweight event at the 1948 Summer Olympics.

References

External links
 

1926 births
Possibly living people
Spanish male boxers
Olympic boxers of Spain
Boxers at the 1948 Summer Olympics
Heavyweight boxers